Labs Kita... Okey Ka Lang? is a 1998 Filipino drama (film and television) and romantic-comedy film released by Star Cinema directed by Jerry Lopez Sineneng. The film, which was entirely shot at Baguio, stars Jolina Magdangal and Marvin Agustin in their third film together as love team partner, and are joined by Hilda Koronel, Ronaldo Valdez and Gina Pareño. The film became a movie reference for best friends falling in love with each other. In January 2017, the film was digitally restored and remastered by the ABS-CBN Film Restoration Project.

Plot
Bujoy (Jolina Magdangal) and Ned (Marvin Agustin) are childhood best friends. They stick with each other like a family. 

However, as time goes by Bujoy fell in love with Ned, who she thinks is the only person who accepts her imperfections that even her own family does not accept. Bujoy’s hobby which is clay sculpture is all dedicated for Ned. Ned, on the other hand finds inspiration in songwriting, to which he dedicates to the girl of his dreams, Marry Anne (Vanessa Del Bianco). 

Ned inherited his passion for music from his father Canor (Ronaldo Valdez), who is a frustrated musician. However his mother Cora (Gina Pareño) thinks that music will not help with their financial constraints. As Ned and Marry Anne became a couple, Bujoy started going out with Cenon (Gio Alvarez), the newest member of Ned’s band. Ned started to realize his feelings for Bujoy. 

But is it too late now? Will they remain friends for the rest of their life or will they find the will to be true to themselves?

Cast

Main cast
 Jolina Magdangal as Bujoy
 Marvin Agustin as Ned
 Hilda Koronel as Marissa, Bujoy's mother
 Ronaldo Valdez as Kanor
 Gina Pareño as Cora

Supporting
 Meryll Soriano as Mayo
 Gio Alvarez as Cenon
 Vanessa Del Bianco as Mary Ann
 Migui Moreno as Erwin
 Vhong Navarro as Jason
 Jeffrey Hidalgo as Ice

Soundtrack
The accompanying soundtrack album to the film was released on July 24, 1998, by Star Music, a month before the official theatrical release of the film itself. Mid August, the album was awarded with a gold record certification, few weeks before the film debuted in theaters, and was expected to reach at least a platinum record. Eventually, it was awarded with a 2× platinum certification from the Philippine Association of the Record Industry on May 20, 1999. The album is considered as one of the most popular soundtrack albums in the Philippines spawning such radio hits as the Jolina Magdangal-original "Kapag Ako Ay Nagmahal" and boy band Jeremiah's "Naghihinayang".

Track listing

Commercial performance 
Mid August 1998, the album was awarded with a gold record certification, few weeks before the film itself debuted in theaters, and was expected to reach at least a platinum record. Eventually, it was awarded with a 2× platinum certification from the Philippine Association of the Record Industry on May 20, 1999. The album produced the Magdangal signature song "Kapag Ako Ay Nagmahal".

Personnel 
Adapted from the Labs Kita... Okey Ka Lang? Original Motion Picture Soundtrack liner notes.

 Larry S. Hermoso – album producer
 Buddy Medina – executive producer
 Rene A. Salta – a&r supervision
 Gerald Michael Y. Portacio – production supervision
 Alvin C. Nunez – arranger (tracks 1, 2, 4, 7, 9)
 Dennis S. Quila – arranger (tracks 3, 6)
 Moi Ortiz – vocal arrangement (track 5)
 Blusero Band – arranger (track 8)
 Joy C. Marfil – orchestral arrangement (track 10), vocal arrangement (track 11)
 Nikki Cunanan – recording engineer (tracks 1, 2, 5, 6, 9)
 Efren San Pedro – recording engineer (tracks 1, 2, 6, 10, 11)
 Christopher Navarro – recording engineer (tracks 3, 4, 7)
 Joel Mendoza – recording engineer (tracks 3, 6, 9)
 Don Manalang – recording engineer (track 8)
 Jeffrey Feliz – recording engineer (track 8)
 Dante San Pedro – mixing engineer (tracks 1, 2, 5, 7, 9, 10, 11)
 Jerry Joanino – mixing engineer (tracks 3, 4, 6)
 Jun Reyes – mixing engineer (track 8)
 Matt Rosanes – cover & lay-out design

References

External links

1998 films
1998 romantic comedy-drama films
Philippine romantic comedy-drama films
Tagalog-language films
Star Cinema films
Films directed by Jerry Lopez Sineneng